The Luanda Light Rail is a proposed light rail line to be built in the Angolan capital city Luanda, at a projected cost of US $3 billion.

Background
In 2019, the proposal for a light rail network in Luanda was announced, with construction proposed to begin in 2020.
German transport company Siemens Mobility signed a memorandum of understanding with the Angolan government in early 2020 to begin building the  network under a public private partnership.

Network
The network is proposed to serve the main axis of the city; from the Port of Luanda to Cacuaco, Avenida Fidel Castro Ruz-Benfica, Port of Luanda - Largo da Independência and Cidade do Kilamba - 1º de Maio.

The initial , named the Yellow Line, is proposed link Port of Luanda with Kilamba via Quatro de Fevereiro Airport, Unidade Operativo de Luanda and Sapú. Construction could begin in 2021, however without the involvement of Siemens.

References

Municipalities in Luanda
Light rail in Africa
Rail transport in Angola